Stephanie Park (born November 28, 1993) is a Canadian Paralympic wheelchair basketball player from Vancouver, British Columbia who won a gold medal in  Women's CWBL National Championships.

References

1993 births
Living people
Paralympic wheelchair basketball players of Canada
Basketball players from Vancouver